Andrea Borgato (born 14 December 1972) is an Italian para table tennis player and has represented his country in the Summer Paralympics of 2012, 2016 and 2020. He became quadriplegic after being involved in a car accident in 1995.

References

Italian male table tennis players
Paralympic table tennis players of Italy
Table tennis players at the 2012 Summer Paralympics
Table tennis players at the 2016 Summer Paralympics
Living people
1972 births
Table tennis players at the 2020 Summer Paralympics